Kelly McMichael is a Canadian singer-songwriter from Peterborough, Ontario, currently based in St. John's, Newfoundland and Labrador. Her debut full-length album Waves was released in 2021, and was shortlisted for the 2022 Polaris Music Prize.

A graduate of the integrated arts program at Peterborough Collegiate and Vocational School and the fine arts program at the University of Guelph, McMichael spent some time in Toronto before moving to St. John's, performing as a keyboardist in Gentleman Reg's band and fronting the pop band Rouge. After moving to St. John's she has performed both under her own name and under the stage name Renders, and began recording Waves in 2019. The album was delayed when she and her co-producer/engineer/drummer Jake Nicoll were both stranded back in Ontario during COVID-19 lockdowns, with production and mixing continuing remotely.

She has also performed as part of Sarah Harmer's band during her tour to support Are You Gone.

References

21st-century Canadian women singers
Canadian women singer-songwriters
Canadian women pop singers
Canadian women rock singers
Musicians from Peterborough, Ontario
Musicians from St. John's, Newfoundland and Labrador
Living people
Year of birth missing (living people)